Dreams is a 2004 Indian Tamil-language romance film directed by Kasthuri Raja and produced by Saraswathi Srikanth. The film featured Raja's son Dhanush in the lead role with Diya. The music was composed by Bharadwaj with cinematography by Kichas. The film released on 12 November 2004 and opened to negative reviews and became a failure at the box office.

Premise
Shakti, a young man, is spoilt by his father and leads a wayward life. However, when he falls in love, he works on changing himself for the better but things take a turn for the worse.

Cast

 Dhanush as Shakti
 Diya as Shruti
 Parul Yadav as Charu
 Pyramid Natarajan as Shakti's father
 Rajyalakshmi as Shakti's mother
 Kaajal Pasupathi as Shakti's friend
 Ramji as Guna
 Manobala as Moosa
 Thalaivasal Vijay as Mahendran, Shruti's father
 Kuyili as Charu's mother
 Nithin Sathya as Shakti's friend
 Rajesh
 Poovilangu Mohan
 Karthik Sabesh
 Aryan
 Bala Singh
 Sujibala
 Vasanthi in a special appearance

Production

The project was launched shortly after the success of Thulluvadho Ilamai in 2002, but as Dhanush's Kaadhal Kondein became a large success, Dreams was stalled temporarily as Dhanush's dates became blocked. The film ran into a legal tussle with the makers of his other film, Sullan, with the producers adamant that Dreams was released first although to no avail. The film's delay meant that Dhanush shot ten straight days for the project to complete it, while the delay also had resulted in failings in continuity. By the time of the release, the producer Srikanth and director Kasthuri Raja were still engaged in a legal tussle.

Music

Release
The film upon release in November 2004 gained unanimously poor reviews from critics. A critic described that the "film is poor pastiche of double meanings, bedroom scenes and a few other vulgar segments", criticizing all aspects and giving it a verdict as a "dull and laborious film".

The film opened simultaneously with two successful ventures, Ajith's Attahasam and Simbu's Manmadhan and subsequently Dreams started slowly and eventually became a colossal failure.

References

External links 
 

2004 films
2000s Tamil-language films
Films scored by Bharadwaj (composer)
Indian erotic romance films
Indian coming-of-age films
Films directed by Kasthuri Raja